Gramma is a genus of fishes native to tropical waters of the western Atlantic Ocean and the Caribbean Sea.

Description
Members of the genus Gramma are brightly colored, generally with two different colors.

Species
There are currently five recognized species in this genus:
 Gramma brasiliensis I. Sazima (fr), Gasparini & R. L. Moura, 1998 (Brazilian basslet)
 Gramma dejongi Victor & J. E. Randall, 2010(Golden basslet)
 Gramma linki Starck & P. L. Colin, 1978 (Yellowlined basslet)
 Gramma loreto Poey, 1868 (Royal gramma)
 Gramma melacara J. E. Böhlke & J. E. Randall, 1963 (Blackcap basslet)

References

External links
Animal Diversity
Catalogue of Life

 
Grammatidae
Marine fish genera
Taxa named by Felipe Poey